Anjiravand (also Romanized as Anjrāvand and Anjīr Āvand; also known as Anjerāvand and Mazra‘eh) is a village in Zarrin Rural District, Kharanaq District, Ardakan County, Yazd Province, Iran. At the 2006 census, its population was 118, in 42 families.

References 

Populated places in Ardakan County